Yaweyuha (Yabiyufa) is a Papuan language spoken in the eastern highlands of Papua New Guinea, and it is spoken by around 4,600 people.

References

Kainantu–Goroka languages
Languages of Eastern Highlands Province